Diria is a municipality in the Granada department of Nicaragua.

Municipalities of the Granada Department